Robert Nicholas Christian Topala (born 23 February 1987), also known as RobTop, is an independent Swedish video game developer who created the platformer game Geometry Dash.

Career 
On June 6, 2010, Robert Topala created his first video game, Bounce Ball Thingy, on Newgrounds, developing it while he was at university studying civil engineering. He later abandoned his course because he became more interested in the video game industry.

Topala decided to work alone, founding RobTop Games in 2012. The first video game he produced under RobTop Games was Boomlings, a puzzle video game released on November 5, 2012 for mobile devices, Topala continued to produce video games, including Memory Mastermind (2013) and Boomlings MatchUp (2013).

On April 29, 2013, Topala announced the platform video game Geometry Jump, later Geometry Dash. It was developed in four months with Topala's (at the time) basic programming knowledge, the game was launched on August 13, 2013 for mobile devices and on December 22, 2014 for Steam (Microsoft Windows and macOS).

In 2017, Topala entered the Swedish Young Entrepreneur of the Year competition. Making it to the final, he placed second in the competition. The jury cited his "extraordinary talent" and the homegrown nature of his business as their reasoning for the placing.

In 2018, RobTop Games acquired Fäbodarna AB for  five million krona (around $480,000).

Personal life 
Topala is very closed about his personal life, with some describing him as one of Sweden's most secretive game developers. Born Robert Nicholas Christian Topala on February 23, 1987, Topala lives in Upplands Väsby. It was here where he founded RobTop Games. He is married to Annika Dennerståhl (born 16 September 1989).

Video games

References 

Living people
Swedish video game designers
Video game programmers
1987 births